The Minister of Social Affairs and Gender Equality is a minister in the Icelandic government and currently works under the Ministry of Welfare together with the Minister of Health.

Ministers 

 Ásmundur Einar Daðason

References 

Social affairs ministers
Government ministries of Iceland